This is a list of the colonial governors of North Carolina.

Governors of Roanoke and Raleigh
 Sir Ralph Lane, governor of Roanoke (1585–1586)
 John White, governor of Raleigh (1587–1590)

Governors of Albemarle, 1664–1689

Deputy Governors of North Carolina, 1691-1712
Thomas Jarvis 1691-1694
Thomas Harvey 1694-1699
Henderson Walker 1699-1704 (acting)
Robert Daniell 1704-1705
Thomas Cary 1705-1706
William Glover 1706-1708 (acting)
Thomas Cary 1708-1711

Governors of North Carolina, 1712-1776

See also
List of governors of North Carolina
List of colonial governors of South Carolina
Province of Carolina
Province of North Carolina

Notes

External links
 Carolana.com: The Governors of Carolina
 North Carolina Manual of 1913

Colonial United States (British)
Lists of American colonial governors